The 2011 Croatian Cup Final was a two-legged affair played between Dinamo Zagreb and Varaždin. 
The first leg was played in Zagreb on 11 May 2011, while the second leg was played on 25 May 2011 in Varaždin.

Dinamo Zagreb won the trophy with an aggregate result of 8–2.

Road to the final

First leg

Second leg

References

External links 
  

2011 Final
GNK Dinamo Zagreb matches
NK Varaždin matches
Cup Final